Freziera tomentosa is a species of plant in the Pentaphylacaceae family. It is found in Colombia, Ecuador, Peru, and Venezuela.

References

tomentosa
Near threatened plants
Taxonomy articles created by Polbot